Academic City may refer to:

 Akademgorodok, Siberia
 Dubai International Academic City, United Arab Emirates

See also 
 College town
 :Category:Academic enclaves